Marian Henderson (16 April 1937 – 21 May 2015) was an Australian folk and jazz singer later referred to as "the queen of the (Australian) 1960s folk revival". She worked extensively in Australian folk and jazz clubs during the 1960s and 1970s and appeared on television and a number of Australian folk music recordings, though recorded only one album under her own name.

Life and career
Henderson was born Marian Grossman in Melbourne, Australia, to an air force family which moved frequently with her father's job, resulting in her attending 13 schools.
 Her first musical instrument was piano, which she played by ear in her early teens. From age 18 she commenced singing jazz (frequently with rock-and-roll bands) and then gravitated towards folk music, learning the guitar with which to accompany her own singing in the style of other popular performers of the early 1960s.

For several years she had been dating ex-schoolmate and fellow musician/songwriter Don Henderson, with whom she formed a rock and roll band, the Thunderbirds, before she lost interest and turned to jazz singing. The couple married in 1958. Don encouraged her career and wrote songs for her to sing but the marriage lasted only until 1962. Marian, however, kept the surname Henderson as a performing name for the remainder of her career.

From 1961 to 1962, Henderson joined with the Australian folk singer Alex Hood and international jazz guitarist/commercial artist Chris Daw, recently arrived in Sydney, in the trio "Daw, Hood And Henderson" which released an EP of "workers' songs", Oh Pay Me, in 1962.

From 1963 onwards she was featured as a solo performer at popular Sydney folk music club "the Troubadour" three or four nights a week, performing a mix of British, American and Australian traditional material, and in 1964 was recruited by Pix magazine to record a series of EPs of folk songs for its readers. She performed on ABC Television show including "Jazz Meets Folk" from 1964 onwards alongside jazz musician Don Burrows and others, whose backing also featured on her Pix recordings, plus an episode of the folk music show Dave's Place in 1965. Her own album, Cameo, was released on MCA in 1970; in addition to touring in Australia, she also performed overseas including in New Guinea, Fiji and Ireland. In 1971 she took the female lead on two tracks on fellow Australian singer Harry Robertson's seminal album of whaling songs, Whale Chasing Men, singing lead on "Norfolk Whalers" and "Whaling Wife". Henderson was also the host and featured singer in a new contemporary music show on Australian television, Sit Yourself Down, Take A Look Round, that premiered in 1974.

Henderson was an attraction in the Australian folk and contemporary/popular music scene up till the late 1970s, when she effectively retired from music to bring up her son, first in Lismore then in the small village of Nimbin, New South Wales. In 1978 she participated in a one-off progressive jazz rock recording by a group entitled "First Light", released on Music Farm Studios, a small label operating out of the Byron Bay hinterland. She made her final recorded appearance (a duet with fellow singer Margret RoadKnight) at a live concert by the latter recorded in Nimbin in 1988.

In her later years Henderson lived quietly in an artistic environment, enjoying camping, the beach, and creating a beautiful garden. She died in 2015 aged 78, after suffering from cancer from several years; her ashes were scattered at the small New South Wales coastal town of Brunswick Heads.

She married twice, first to Don Henderson and then to Tom Baker with whom she had a son. Baker died in 1970.

On her death, the Australian folk music promoter and commentator Warren Fahey noted:

An extended reissue of Henderson's 1970 album Cameo was released in 2016 on the Stoned Circle label, incorporating all known additional tracks from her hard-to-find earlier EPs plus other material.

Discography and filmography
 Daw, Hood And Henderson: Oh Pay Me (6 track EP, Blue and White Collar Records BW 1, 1962) (with  Chris Daw and Alex Hood)
 Various artists: Old Botany Bay (Music for Pleasure 1964). Henderson sings on Adieu to Ye Judges and Juries (with John Currie); The Convict Maid; Van Dieman's Land; Girl with the Black Velvet Band (with John Currie); Moreton Bay; Bold Jack O'Donohue (John Currie with Marian Henderson)
 Marian Henderson: Australian Folk Songs Volume 1 (Pix Records PX-006, 1964: EP). Tracks: Botany Bay; Springtime It Brings on the Shearing; The Old Bark Hut; Peter Clarke
 Marian Henderson: Australian Folk Songs Volume 2 (Pix Records PX-007, 1964: EP). Tracks: Waltzing Matilda; Jim Jones of Botany Bay; Euabalong Ball; Van Dieman's Land
 Marian Henderson: Great Folk Songs Of The World Volume 1 (Pix Records PX-008, 1964: EP). Tracks: Down By The River Side; Lolly Too Dum; Kisses Sweeter Than Wine; This Old Town
 Marian Henderson: Great Folk Songs Of The World Volume 2 (Pix Records PX-009, 1964: EP). Tracks: Swing Low, Sweet Chariot; Kum-By-Ya; Black Is The Colour Of My True Love's Hair; I Know Where I'm Going
 Various artists: "The Restless Years" - 1967 TV show featuring Henderson, Tina Lawton, Declan Affley, Alex Hood, Rob Inglis and Peter O'Shaughnessy with musical assistance from The Claire Poole Singers and the Don Burrows Quintet featuring George Golla - described further here
 Various artists: The Restless Years, book with accompanying LP (1968), Jacaranda Press. Henderson sings "Moreton Bay", "Look Out Below", "The Streets of Forbes" and "Old Black Alice"
 Marian Henderson:  Cameo (MCA 1970). Tracks: Antique Annie's Magic Lantern Show; Miss Otis Regrets; Stranger Song; Lady of Carlisle; Fotheringay; Streets of Forbes; First Boy I Loved; Country Girl; Guess Who I Saw Today; Bald Mountain; Convict Maid; Sprig of Thyme
 Harry Robertson: Whale Chasing Men (Music For Pleasure, 1971). Henderson (credited as "Marion Henderson") sings lead on "Norfolk Whalers" and "Whaling Wife"
 Various artists: 3 Floors Down (RCA Camden OCMS 175, 1972). Henderson (credited as "Marion Henderson") sings "Moon and Mice"
 First Light: First Light (Music Farm Studios MFS 0002, 1978). A progressive jazz rock album featuring Marian Henderson on vocals, with Ron Carpenter, Harry Freeman, John Gray, Graham Jesse, Alan Freeman and others.
 Margret RoadKnight: An Audience with Margret RoadKnight (Grevillea Records, 1988). Includes "For All the Good People" (duet Marian Henderson with Margret RoadKnight)
 An interview with Marian Henderson, retired jazz, blues and folk singer by Alex Hood and Annette Hood (2002). Includes "Ben's Waltz" (played during the interview by Marian on her piano at home) http://trove.nla.gov.au/work/16855641?selectedversion=NBD24171678
  Marian Henderson:  Cameo (Stoned Circle STC2CD3014, 2016) - re-released as double CD with additional tracks from her earlier EPs etc.

References

External links
 Marian Henderson discography at discogs.com
 Releases on the Pix label via www.45cat.com - including all four of Marian's Pix EPs (cover art, liner notes available by clicking any illustrated label)
 www.mudcat.org: Obit: Marian Henderson, Australia, 21 May 2015
 Marian Henderson songs, TV appearances etc. available on Youtube
 "The Restless Years" original 1967 TV production (review plus links to download as .avi file)
 A 33 min episode of "Sit Yourself Down, Take A Look Around" (ABC TV, 1974) on Youtube (3 parts)
 Folkies. The Sydney Folk Scene. GTK 1970 - 9 mins 1970 TV segment on the Sydney Folk Scene, featuring Henderson from approx. 7.12 (also includes Cliff Atkinson who ran the PACT Folk club, Declan Affley, and others)

1937 births
2015 deaths
Australian folk singers
20th-century Australian women singers